Thai Nguyen (born 1980) is a Vietnamese-American fashion designer and television personality. He is known for his role as the fashion expert on the Netflix series Say I Do.

Early life
Nguyen was born in Mỹ Tho in the southern Tiền Giang Province of Vietnam. He learned to sew at the age of 9 at his parents' private sewing school. The family immigrated to the United States in 1993 when Thai was 13 where they lived in Washington State. Nguyen graduated from Olympia High School in 1999. He was an officer in the Future Business Leaders of America. Nguyen then moved to California to study at the Fashion Institute of Design & Merchandising.

Career
Nguyen worked as an associate designer for BCBG Max Azria before launching his own fashion business Thai Nguyen Atelier. During his career, Nguyen's designs have been seen on the red carpet for celebrities including Kristen Bell, Jennifer Lopez, Katy Perry and many others. He specializes in custom design.

In addition to Netflix's 2020 series Say I Do, Nguyen has worked on Bravo's Launch My Line and RuPaul's Drag Race. He was also a judge representing Vietnam on the CBS talent competition World's Best in 2019.

Personal life
Nguyen is openly gay and has a fiancé.

References

External links
 Thai Nguyen Atelier
 

Living people
Gay entertainers
American LGBT people of Asian descent
Vietnamese LGBT entertainers
LGBT people from Washington (state)
LGBT fashion designers
People from Mỹ Tho
Vietnamese company founders
Vietnamese emigrants to the United States
Vietnamese fashion designers
Vietnamese television personalities
1980 births